The following is a discography of albums, singles, music videos, downloads, and unreleased tracks by the American rock band Hurt. Since 2000, the band has released six studio albums and eight singles. Hurt (sometimes typeset as HURT) is an alternative metal band formed in 2000 in Virginia but that is now located out of Los Angeles, California, United States. Currently signed with independent label Carved Records, the band has put out four major label albums. The group consists of lead singer J. Loren Wince, guitarist Michael Roberts, bassist Rek Mohr, and drummer Victor Ribas.

Studio albums

Compilation albums

Extended plays

Singles

Music videos

Downloadable songs

Notes
Danse Russe from the CONNECTSets collection is also known as the “Danse Russe (Raw Mix) ”
The CONNECTSets songs are part of a digital download from many of the online music stores such as Amazon. These songs were recorded in studio, and sound much like the versions that are performed at live shows. At a point, "Danse Russe," and "Falls Apart" were both put up for download on the band's Myspace.

Myspace downloadable songs

Notes
All the songs here were placed for download on HURT's official Myspace page as downloadable tracks.

Unreleased material

Live
"Incomplete" - (Performed during a show in St. Louis, MO in 2008. Fan recordings only.)

In studio
"Eat" - (Recorded to be on The Consumation album, but never released.)
"Incomplete" - (Recorded to be on ”Self-Titled” album, but never released.)

Besides & Footnotes
In 2015, a "B Side" record of previously unreleased tracks re-recorded in the studio was announced on the band's official social media pages with a second disk with J Loren talking about the history of those songs.

Track Listing 
Danse Russe Redux
Incomplete
House of Cards
Hospital Scene
Another Time
That (Such A Thing) (Jazzy Remix)
Trigger Happy Jesus
Rock 'N' Roll
Letter's From Nowhere
The Party
Danse Russe (Demo Ver)
Incomplete (Demo Ver)
Hospital Scene (Demo Ver)
Eat

Cover songs

Live
"Nothingman" - (Originally performed by Pearl Jam, played acoustically during a Huntsville, AL show, and again in studio at FM Talk 105.7)
"Grind" - (Originally performed by Alice In Chains, performed at the Layne Staley Benefit Concert)
"Nutshell" - (Originally performed by Alice In Chains, performed at the Layne Staley Benefit Concert)

Studio
"Nothingman" -Originally performed by Pearl Jam
"No Excuses" - Originally performed by Alice In Chains, this was a studio cover/collaboration with the band Smile Empty Soul.

Other appearances

References

Discographies of American artists
Rock music group discographies